Kateřina Havlíčková (née Hošková, born 5 January 1985) is a Czech slalom canoeist who has competed at the international level since 2000.

Havlíčková won six medals at the ICF Canoe Slalom World Championships with a gold (C1: 2011), four silvers (C1: 2015; C1 team: 2013, 2015, 2018) and a bronze (C1 team: 2019). She won the overall world cup title in the C1 class in 2014. She also won five medals at the European Championships (3 silvers and 2 bronzes).

World Cup individual podiums

References

External links

Czech female canoeists
Living people
1985 births
Sportspeople from Brno
Medalists at the ICF Canoe Slalom World Championships